Saastamoinen is a Finnish surname. Notable people with the surname include:

 Armas Saastamoinen (1886–1946), Finnish businessman
 Eino Saastamoinen (1887–1946), Finnish gymnast
 Yrjö Saastamoinen (1888–1966), Finnish diplomat and CEO
 Jarmo Saastamoinen (born 1967), Finnish football player

Finnish-language surnames